Amgu Airport  is an airport in Amgu, Primorsky Krai, Russia.

References

Airports in Primorsky Krai